Koggala is a small coastal town, situated at the edge of a lagoon on the south coast of Sri Lanka, located in Galle District, Southern Province, Sri Lanka, governed by an Urban Council. Koggala is bounded on one side by a reef, and on the other by a large lake, Koggala Lake, into which the numerous tributaries of the Koggala Oya drain.

History
Koggala has one of the longest beaches in Sri Lanka, and is located in close proximity to the popular tourist resort of Unawatuna, Koggala in comparison is relatively uncluttered as a tourist destination and mostly unexplored.

It is the birthplace of noted Sri Lankan author Martin Wickramasinghe and there is a museum, Martin Wickramasinghe Folk Art Museum, dedicated to his arts and popular traditions in the town.

The temple is renowned for its Kandyan-style paintings in the main shrine, dating from the late 19th century. The paintings of musicians, dancers and European figures illustrates an interesting piece of social history. Some of the Jatake tales (episodes from the Buddha's series of 550 previous lives) are painted here, and purportedly are 200 years old. There are also some cameo-style paintings of Queen Victoria and the Queen Mother, done in gratitude of Queen Victoria's role in ensuring the free practice of Buddhism outlined in the Kandyan capitulation of Lanka in 1815.

Koggala is also the home to the Giniwella Kathaluwa and the ancient  Temples. The Kathaluwa Buddhist temple is known for its murals and for the preserved first printing press, brought by the Dutch to Sri Lanka.

The area is also famous for its distinct stilt fishermen, who erect a single pole in the chest-deep water on the beach, just few meters off-shore, where they perch on a cross bar and using bamboo fishing rods cast their lines out beyond the surf break to catch small fish.

Transport
Koggala is located on the Coastal or Southern Rail Line (connecting Colombo through to Matara), and the A2 highway, connecting Colombo to Wellawaya.

Facilities
 Koggala railway station
 Koggala Airport

Attractions
 Martin Wickramasinghe Folk Art Museum
 Koggala Lake
 Koggala Beach
 Turtle Hatcheries
 Kataluva Purvarama Maha Viharaya
 Stilt Fisherman

Post and telephone
 Sri Lanka 00 94
 Area code 228
 Postal code 80630

See also
 List of towns in Galle Province, Sri Lanka
 List of beaches in Sri Lanka

References

Populated places in Galle District
Populated places in Southern Province, Sri Lanka
Seaside resorts in Sri Lanka